Quebrada may refer to:

Places

Argentina
 Quebrada de Las Flechas, a valley in the province of Salta in northern Argentina
 Quebrada de Humahuaca, World Heritage, a valley in the province of Jujuy in northern Argentina 
 Quebrada de Luna, village in Argentina

Bolivia
 Quebrada Honda, a fossil site in southern Bolivia

Brazil
 Canoa Quebrada, a seaside resort in northeastern Brazil

Chile
 Quebrada del Nuevo Reino, a village in Pichilemu, Chile

Colombia
 Quebrada Limas, a small river in Bogotá

Costa Rica
 Quebrada Grande, village in Guanacaste, Costa Rica

Puerto Rico
Quebrada, Camuy, Puerto Rico, a barrio
Quebrada, San Lorenzo, Puerto Rico, a barrio
Quebrada Arenas, Las Piedras, Puerto Rico, a barrio
Quebrada Arenas, Maunabo, Puerto Rico, a barrio
Quebrada Arenas, San Lorenzo, Puerto Rico, a barrio
Quebrada Arenas, Toa Alta, Puerto Rico, a barrio
Quebrada Arenas, Vega Baja, Puerto Rico, a barrio
Quebrada Arenas, San Juan, Puerto Rico, a barrio
Quebrada Arriba, Cayey, Puerto Rico, a barrio
Quebrada Arriba, Patillas, Puerto Rico, a barrio
Quebrada Grande, Barranquitas, Puerto Rico, a barrio
Quebrada Grande, Mayagüez, Puerto Rico, a barrio
Quebrada Grande, Trujillo Alto, Puerto Rico, a barrio
Quebrada Honda, Guayanilla, Puerto Rico, a barrio
Quebrada Honda, San Lorenzo, Puerto Rico, a barrio
Quebrada Limón, a barrio in Ponce, Puerto Rico
 Quebrada Maracuto, prehistoric rock paintings in Carolina, Puerto Rico 
Quebrada Seca, Ceiba, Puerto Rico, a barrio
Quebrada Yeguas, a barrio in Salinas, Puerto Rico

Spain
 Torre Quebrada, one of the three towers on the coast of the municipality of Benalmádena, Spain

Venezuela
 La Quebrada, Venezuela, a Venezuelan city, the capital of the municipality of Urdaneta

Other  
 La Quebrada, an springboard moonsault attack used in professional wrestling invented by Yoshihiro Asai, better known by his gimmick name Último Dragón
 Quebrada (tango), a classic component of Argentine tango styles